The Škoda Felicia, (Typ 791) was a C-segment car produced by the Czech carmaker Škoda Auto from 1994 to 2001. It was the last model on Škoda's own platform, but was one of the first models to benefit from Škoda Auto's takeover by the German company Volkswagen Group. The Felicia was a reworked version of the Favorit, but had a fresh, more modern appearance, with a redesigned front end and a wider range of engines. 

It was premiered in October 1994, on the Charles Bridge in Prague. Serial production of the hatchback began in October 1994, the combi in June 1995, the pick up in August 1995, and it ended in June 2001. The name Felicia was not used for the first time, resurrecting a nameplate originally used by Škoda in the 1960s for a range of two seater sports cars.

History
As the Felicia benefited from Volkswagen input, it helped to elevate Škoda's image in Western Europe. It heralded the first ever diesel powered Škoda, and became their first car to feature major safety and convenience features. Some SLXi models featured air conditioning and velour upholstery. Anti-lock Braking System (ABS), drivers airbag, and seat belt tensioners were also available.

The Felicia made headlines in April 1998, after its high satisfaction score gave Škoda the "Best Manufacturer" accolade in that year's J.D. Power Car Survey. Production of the Felicia ceased at the end of June 2001, one year after the launch of the Fabia. A total of 1,420,489 cars had been made (the pick up and estate models were available for sale throughout 2001), including 19,000 rebranded pick up sold as Volkswagen.

Body styles
The Felicia came in a variety of body styles, both for personal and professional use. The base model was a five door hatchback, and from June 1995, was accompanied by an estate, replacing the Favorit based Forman, now redubbed as the Felicia Combi (Typ 795). 

There was also a coupe utility version, the Felicia Pickup, (Typ 797) and a panel van called a Felicia VanPlus. Pickup featured redesigned rear axle to increase space in cargo area. The pickup version was also imported to some countries re branded as the Volkswagen Caddy Pickup. The pick up model also had a lifestyle edition named the Felicia Fun, (Typ 796) conceived mostly for the market in Western Europe. 

The rear screen section hinges out into the loadbay, allowing two extra seats to be folded out, giving comfortable seating for four adults. A tonneau cover is available to cover the rear seats, which are otherwise open to the elements. A Truckman top is also available which encloses the rear seats and loadbay, making for a more practical bad weather conversion. 

Luggage capacity in the hatchback was 272 litres with the rear seats in the upright position, and this increased to 976 litres with the rear seats folded. For the Combi (estate version), this was 447 and 1,366 litres respectively. The Felicia and Felicia Combi received a minor facelift in In January 1998. 

The most obvious visual change was a redesigned radiator grille and larger bumpers, but changes also included minor upgrades to the chassis and bodyshell to improve crash safety.

United Kingdom
Three years after its launch in the United Kingdom, in April 1998, the Felicia made the headlines with an excellent rating in a Top Gear customer satisfaction survey for N registered cars (sold from August 1995 to July 1996), resulting in the Škoda brand making headlines as the most satisfying brand of car to own, which helped end Skoda's previous reputation in Britain for producing crude, and supposedly unreliable and unfashionable cars. The Felicia received high ratings for reliability, build quality and dealer service. 

These strong showings in motoring surveys have continued with the newer generations of Skoda models. The Felicia's successor, the Fabia, went on sale in the United Kingdom in the beginning of 2000, but the Felicia continued to be imported there until the end of the year, by which time more than 76,000 had been sold, and by August 2011, almost 30,000 examples were still registered on the road.

Powertrain

All internal combustion engines used in Felicia are inline four-cylinder designs, operate on the four-stroke cycle, are fuel injected, and water cooled. Also a four cylinder carburetor engine (43 kW) was available in some countries. The fundamental layout of the Felicia's powertrain included engines mounted at the front of the vehicle, and orientated transversely. 

There were also two engines sourced from Volkswagen Group: a  1.6 litre petrol engine with Magneti Marelli multi point fuel injection, and a  1.9 D diesel engine. The 1.6 litre model served as a homologation basis for the Škoda Felicia Kit Car used in the World Rally Championship's F2 class.

For the Felicia, Škoda had developed its own  aluminium 1.6 OHC engine, which appeared in some Favorit prototypes and Rally cars, but Volkswagen decided to use its old 1.6MPI  The only transmission was a five speed manual gearbox, which was of a transaxle design, and contained the differential and final drive units. Drive was through the front wheels.

Specifications

Gallery

References

Cars introduced in 1994
Felicia
Subcompact cars
Pickup trucks
Front-wheel-drive vehicles
2000s cars
Station wagons